A fleet of motor vehicles shaped like a hot dog on a bun, called "Wienermobile", are used to promote and advertise Oscar Mayer products in the United States. The first Wienermobile was created by Oscar Mayer's nephew, Carl G. Mayer, in 1936.

History
The Oscar Mayer Wienermobile has evolved from Carl Mayer's original 1936 vehicle to the vehicles seen on the road today. Although that first Wienermobile was scrapped for metal in the 1940s to aid the US Army during World War II, in the 1950s Oscar Mayer and the  Gerstenslager Company created several new vehicles using a Dodge chassis or a Willys Jeep chassis. One of these models is on display at the Henry Ford Museum in Dearborn, Michigan. These Wienermobiles were piloted by "Little Oscar" (portrayed by George Molchan) who would visit stores, schools, orphanages, and children's hospitals and participate in parades and festivals.

In 1969, new Wienermobiles were built on a Chevrolet motor home chassis and featured Ford Thunderbird taillights. The 1969 vehicle was the first Wienermobile to travel outside the United States.

In 1976, Plastic Products, Inc., built a fiberglass and styrofoam model, again on a Chevrolet motor home chassis.

In 1988, Oscar Mayer had a fleet of six Wienermobiles built by noted industrial designer Brooks Stevens  using converted Chevrolet van chassis.
 
This version also included the upgraded large parallelogram windows which could now open, as designed by Sheldon Theis.

In 2004, the Wienermobile included a voice-activated GPS navigation device, an audio center with a wireless microphone, a horn that plays the Wiener Jingle (in 21 different genres from Cajun to Rap to Bossa Nova), according to American Eats, and sports fourth generation Pontiac Firebird taillights.

Following mechanical problems with the Isuzu Elf, Oscar Mayer decided to adopt a larger chassis to accommodate an increase in the size of the signature wiener running through the middle. While the Wienermobile was not as long as the 1995 version, it was considerably wider and taller. Craftsmen Industries went through numerous overhauls of the truck including a flipped axle and a leveling kit. This version held a record for numerous suspension problems, most leading to the chassis not being able to hold the large weight of the Oscar Mayer Wiener.

In 2004, Oscar Mayer announced a contest whereby customers could win the right to use the Wienermobile for a day. Within a month, the contest had generated over 15,000 entries.

In June 2017, the company introduced several new hot-dog-themed vehicles, including the WienerCycle, WienerRover, and WienerDrone.

Source: Oscar Mayer

Wienermobile drivers
Six Wienermobiles operate throughout the United States. 

The driver of a Wienermobile is called The Hotdogger. The Hotdogger job is to "meat" and greet people around the country. The duties of a Hotdogger include: "...sharing photos and videos on social media, answering questions about the brand and the vehicle (the most frequently asked question is if there’s a bathroom in the back, to which they respond: 'No, it's not a Weenie-bago'), and distributing swag."

Only college seniors who are about to graduate are eligible to be Hotdoggers. Applicants should be getting their BA or BS, preferably in public relations, journalism, communications, advertising, or marketing.

A Hotdogger's assignment is for only one year. Recruiting for each year's new Hotdogger cadre involves current Hotdoggers and Oscar Mayer recruiters visiting college campuses across the country. In 2018, 7,000 people applied to be Hotdoggers. As each Wienermobile carries two Hotdoggers, only 12 Hotdoggers are selected each year.

Models
Toys and scale replicas of the Wienermobile have been made over the years, with Hot Wheels issuing die-cast versions of the vehicle.

Notable incidents

In June 2007, a Wienermobile with the Wisconsin license plate of YUMMY made headlines after being stopped by an Arizona Department of Public Safety officer for having an allegedly stolen license plate. Officer K. Lankow had observed the Wienermobile slowing traffic and checked the license plate to determine if the vehicle was street legal. The license plate came back as being stolen out of Columbia, Missouri, so the officer stopped the Wienermobile and detained the driver. Oscar Mayer had not notified police that they had obtained a replacement plate after the previous one was stolen, and that it should be considered stolen only if not on a Wienermobile. The Wienermobile was released soon after the error was discovered.

On July 17, 2009, a Wienermobile on a cul-de-sac in Mount Pleasant, Wisconsin, was attempting to turn around in a residential driveway. The driver, thinking the vehicle was in reverse, accelerated forward, lodging the Wienermobile under a house and destroying the house's deck.

On January 26, 2020, a Wienermobile was pulled over by a Waukesha, Wisconsin, sheriff's deputy for violating the Move Over Law, which requires motorists to switch lanes to pass an emergency vehicle with its warning lights on. The driver was issued a warning.

In February 2023, during the Super Bowl LVII weekend, an Oscar Mayer Wienermobile in Las Vegas had its catalytic converter stolen. PETA offered to pay for the replacement part and maintenance for one year if Oscar Mayer converted the vehicle to a vegan hot dog mobile.

References

External links

Wienermobile Instagram
Road Trip America Wienermobile article
Jon Stewart Wienermobile story

Curbside Wienermobile Review by Tony Barthel
You Must Be A Hotdogger To Drive The Wienermobile Video produced by Wisconsin Public Television

One-off cars
Hot dogs
Art vehicles
Vehicles introduced in 1936